The 2017 Down Senior Football Championship was the 109th official edition of Down GAA's premier gaelic football tournament for senior clubs in County Down. 16 teams compete with the winner representing Down in the Ulster Senior Club Football Championship.

The tournament operated a double elimination format for the opening two rounds of the championship, with the winners and early round losers rejoining at the quarter final stage.

Kilcoo Owen Roe's were the defending champions after they defeated Clonduff 3-11 to 0-9 in the 2016 final. On 1 October 2017 they successfully defended their title to claim a "6 in a row" of Down S.F.C. titles when defeating Burren 0-13 to 0-11. The final was broadcast live on TG4.

An Ríocht return to the senior grade after claiming the Down I.F.C. title in 2016. Bredagh make their senior comeback after breaking into the top 15 ranked teams in the Down football leagues for 2016.

Ballymartin and Bredagh are relegated to the 2018 I.F.C. after finishing outside the top 15 ranked teams in the Down football leagues for 2017. They finished 9th and 5th (ranked 21st and 17th overall) respectively in Division 2. Rostrevor and Carryduff will replace them after finishing 2nd and 3rd (ranked overall 14th and 15th) respectively in the Down ACFL Division 2 in 2017. Loughinisland gained a reprieve from relegation after finishing overall ranked 16th, however due to Rostrevor claiming the I.F.C. title, they were permitted to remain senior.

Team changes 

The following teams have changed division since the 2016 championship season.

To S.F.C. 
Promoted from 2016 Down Intermediate Football Championship
 An Ríocht – (IFC Champions)
 Bredagh – (IFL Champions)

From S.F.C. 
Relegated to 2017 Down Intermediate Football Championship
 Annaclone
 Rostrevor

Round 1 
All 16 teams enter the competition in this round. The 8 winners progress to Round 2A while the 8 losers progress to Round 2B.

Round 2

Round 2A 
The 8 winning teams from Round 1 enter this round. The 4 winners enter the draw for the quarter-finals while the 4 losers play in Round 3.

Round 2B 
The 8 losing teams from Round 1 enter this round. The 4 winners go into Round 3 while the 4 losing teams exit the championship.

Round 3 

This is the final qualifier round. The four losing teams from round 2A (who won a match and lost a match) play the four winning teams from round 2B (who lost a match and won a match).

Quarter-finals 

The 4 winners from Round 2A play the 4 winners from Round 3.

Semi-finals

Final

Last Eight

Ulster Senior Club Football Championship

References

Down Senior Football Championship
Down Senior Football Championship